Miltiadis Lionis is a Greek professional footballer who plays as a left back.

References

Greek footballers
1990 births
Living people
Association football midfielders
Apollon Pontou FC players
Football League (Greece) players
Footballers from Thessaloniki